Anahide Ter Minassian born Anahide Kévonian (August 26, 1929 – February 11, 2019) was a French historian of Armenian origin who specialised in modern Armenian history, particularly the pre- and post-Soviet period of Armenian history, and the Armenian revolutionary movement.

Life
Ter Minassian was born in Paris in 1929. Her stateless Armenian parents were Levon Kévonian and Armenouhie Der-Garabédian, who taught her Armenian and refused to send her to a French school until she was seven. She would in time marry the son of Armenian statesman Ruben Ter-Minasian, Leon Ter Minassian, who was also a stateless Armenian. They had four children, including historian Taline Ter Minassian.

In 1969 she went to work at the Sorbonne.

After 40 years of service, she was made a knight of the légion d'honneur in 2015.

Ter Minassian died in Fresnes in 2019. In 2020 a book of Vahé Oshagan's poetry, "Onction", was published in French. His poetry had been translated from Armenian by Ter Minassian.

Anahide Ter Minassian's younger brother, Kéram Kévonian (born 1942), is also a specialist in Armenian history.

Works
 La Question Arménienne (Marseille, 1983)
 Nationalism and Socialism in the Armenian Revolutionary Movement (1887-1912) (Cambridge, Mass., 1984)
 1918-1920-La République d’Arménie (Bruxelles, 1989, 2006)
 Histoires croisées: diaspora, Arménie, Transcaucasie (Marseille, 1997)
 Smyrne, la ville oubliée?: mémoires d’un grand port ottoman, 1830-1930 (editions Autrement, 2006)
 Nos terres d’enfance, l’Arménie des souvenirs, avec Houri Varjabédian (Marseille, 2010)

References

1929 births
2019 deaths
Academic staff of the University of Paris
Historians of Armenia
French people of Armenian descent
20th-century French historians